This list of aircraft of the Portuguese Air Force also includes aircraft that were operated by the Portuguese Army and Portuguese Navy aviation services, prior to the creation of the Air Force in 1952.

Aircraft inventory

Military Aeronautics 
The Army's Aeronáutica Militar (Military Aeronautics) was the first military aviation service created in Portugal and much of the Portuguese aviation origins date back to it.

Naval Aviation 
The Navy's Aviação Naval (Naval Aviation) was created in 1917. In 1993, the Naval Aviation was reborn with the creation of the Esquadrilha de Helicópteros da Marinha (Navy's Helicopter Squadron), which operates the helicopters that serve on board the Navy's ships.

Army Artillery Arm 
After Military Aeronautics becoming an independent branch, the Portuguese Army activated a small aviation component in its Artillery Arm. This aviation component was disbanded in 1955, with its aircraft and role being transferred to the Air Force.

Air Force 
The Portuguese Air Force (PoAF) was founded in 1952 as the result of the amalgamation of the Aeronáutica Militar and Aviação Naval. With the merger many aircraft were transferred from these earlier aviation services to the Air Force, having been in service before 1952.

See also 
 Portuguese military aircraft serials
 Portuguese Naval Aviation
 Portuguese Air Force
 Portuguese Colonial War
 OGMA
 UALE

References

Notes

Sources 
 
 
 
 
 
 
 
 
 
 
 
 
 
 
 
 
 
 
 
 
 
 
 
 
 

Portuguese Air Force
Portugal military-related lists
Military of Portugal